CP-122,288 is a drug which acts as a potent and selective agonist for the 5-HT1B, 5-HT1D and 5-HT1F serotonin receptor subtypes. It is a derivative of the migraine medication sumatriptan, but while CP-122,288 is 40,000 times more potent than sumatriptan as an inhibitor of neurogenic inflammation and plasma protein extravasation, it is only twice as potent as a constrictor of blood vessels. In human trials, CP-122,288 was not found to be effective as a treatment for migraine, but its selectivity for neurogenic anti-inflammatory action over vasoconstriction has made it useful for research into the underlying causes of migraine.

See also 
 5-MeO-MPMI
 CP-135807
 Eletriptan

References 

5-HT1B agonists
5-HT1D agonists
5-HT1F agonists
Pyrrolidines
Tryptamines
Amines